Cahoon is a surname. Notable people with the surname include:

 Ben Cahoon (born 1972), football player in the CFL
Elizabeth K. Cahoon, Georgian-American epidemiologist
 Frank Kell Cahoon (1934–2013), American businessman and politician
 Kevin Cahoon, American actor/singer/songwriter
 Lauren Cahoon (born 1985), Taekwondo martial artist
 Martha Cahoon (1905 - 1999), American artist
 Ralph Cahoon (1910 - 1982), artist and furniture decorator
 Reynolds Cahoon (1790-1861), Latter-day Saint builder of Kirtland Temple
 Richard Cahoon (1905 – 1985), American film editor
 S. S. Calhoon (1838–1908), justice of the Supreme Court of Mississippi
 Tiny Cahoon (1900 - 1973), American football player
 Todd Cahoon (born 1973), American actor
 William Cahoon (1774 - 1833), United States politician from Vermont

See also
 Cahoon Museum of American Art
 Sera Cahoone
 Calhoun (disambiguation), a variant of the name
 Colquhoun, a variant spelling of Cahoon
 Clan Colquhoun, a Scottish Clan